Ensign (later Lieutenant Commander) George Henry Gay Jr. (March 8, 1917 – October 21, 1994) was a Douglas TBD Devastator pilot in United States Navy Torpedo Squadron 8 operating from the aircraft carrier  in the Pacific Theater of Operations during World War II. Of the 30 VT-8 aircrew from Hornet that participated in the pivotal Battle of Midway, Ensign Gay was the sole survivor.

Early years
George Henry Gay Jr. was born on March 8, 1917, in Waco, Texas. He attended school in both Austin and Houston before enrolling at the Agricultural and Mechanical College of Texas (now Texas A&M University).

World War II
Like millions of Americans at the time, Gay chose to sign up for the coming war, leaving Texas A&M University. He tried to join the Army Air Corps as a pilot but was rejected for medical reasons. He then tried the United States Navy in early 1941. Gay completed flight training and was commissioned as an ensign in September 1941.

He joined the newly formed Torpedo Squadron 8 under Lieutenant Commander John Charles Waldron. He and his unit were aboard the aircraft carrier  in April 1942 when Lieutenant Colonel Jimmy Doolittle launched his raid on Tokyo. One week later, Hornet arrived at Pearl Harbor to join  as part of Task Force 16 during the Battle of Midway.

During the Battle of Midway, Gay was the first of his squadron to take off from Hornet on June 4, 1942. Gay's unit found the Japanese carrier fleet and launched an attack without any fighter plane support. Although he was wounded and his radioman/gunner, Robert K. Huntington, was dying, Gay completed his torpedo attack on the Japanese aircraft carrier , but Sōryū evaded his torpedo. Rather than banking away from the ship and presenting a larger target to its anti-aircraft gunners, Gay continued in toward the carrier at low altitude. He then brought his Devastator into a tight turn as he approached the carrier's island, and flew aft along the flight deck's length, thus evading anti-aircraft fire. He later stated he had a "split second" thought of crashing into the Japanese aircraft he saw being serviced on the flight deck.

With his aircraft still in relatively good condition, he decided to make for Hornet after clearing the Japanese carrier. However, five Mitsubishi A6M Zeros brought his aircraft down in a hail of machine gun and cannon fire, killing his rear gunner, ARM3c Robert K. Huntington.

Exiting his aircraft, and floating in the ocean, he hid under his seat cushion for hours to avoid Japanese strafing attacks and witnessed the subsequent dive bombing attacks and sinking of three of the four Japanese aircraft carriers present.

After dark, Gay felt it was safe to inflate his life raft. He was rescued by a Navy Consolidated PBY Catalina after spending over 30 hours in the water. Of the squadron's thirty pilots and radiomen, Gay was the only survivor.

Gay later met with Admiral Nimitz and confirmed the destruction of three Japanese carriers he had witnessed – ,  and Sōryū.  He was featured in the August 31, 1942, issue of Life magazine.

Following Midway, Gay took part in the Guadalcanal Campaign with Torpedo Squadron 11, and later became a Navy flight instructor.

He was awarded the Navy Cross and Purple Heart for his actions in combat at Midway and was later awarded an Air Medal.

Later years
After World War II, Gay spent over 30 years as a pilot for Trans World Airlines. He often lectured on his Midway experiences, and authored the book Sole Survivor. In 1975, he served as a consultant on the set for the movie Midway, in which Kevin Dobson played Gay.

In May 1994 Gay was named to the Georgia Aviation Hall of Fame.

On October 21, 1994, Gay died of a heart attack at a hospital in Marietta, Georgia. His body was cremated and his ashes spread at the place that his squadron had launched its ill-fated attack.

Awards

Navy Cross citation

Ensign George Henry Gay, Jr
U.S. Navy
Date Of Action: June 4, 1942
The President of the United States of America takes pleasure in presenting the Navy Cross to Ensign George Henry Gay, Jr., United States Naval Reserve, for extraordinary heroism in operations against the enemy while serving as Pilot of a carrier-based Navy Torpedo Plane of Torpedo Squadron EIGHT (VT-8), attached to the U.S.S. HORNET (CV-8), during the "Air Battle of Midway," against enemy Japanese forces on 4 June 1942. Grimly aware of the hazardous consequences of flying without fighter protection, and with insufficient fuel to return to his carrier, Ensign Gay, resolutely, and with no thought of his own life, delivered an effective torpedo attached against violent assaults of enemy Japanese aircraft and against an almost solid barrage of anti-aircraft fire. His courageous action, carried out with a gallant spirit of self-sacrifice and a conscientious devotion to the fulfillment of his mission, was a determining factor in the defeat of the enemy forces and was in keeping with the highest traditions of the United States Naval Service.

References

External links
 Naval Historical Center
 Naval Historical Center - Recollections
 Copy of News Report w/ Lt. George Gay

1917 births
1994 deaths
Battle of Midway
Shot-down aviators
Sole survivors
Recipients of the Navy Cross (United States)
Recipients of the Air Medal
United States Navy officers
United States Navy bomber pilots of World War II
People from Waco, Texas
Texas A&M University alumni
Military personnel from Texas
Burials at sea